Lack of thorough training on the specific system of safety and health signs and signals plays the pivotal role in furnishing the accidents in the woodworking sector. The established contacts with managers from SMEs and companies in Wood Industry also confirmed the current needs for this particular training. SMEs, in particular, have fewer resources to put complex systems of worker protection in place and tend to be more affected by the negative impact of health and safety problems.

Woodworking machines, wood dust, fire and explosion, noise, vibrations, manual handling operations in Wood Industry, hazardous and chemical substances, slips and trips are some of the biggest concerns.

Federal regulators are drawing up new standards for handling industrial and wood dust following a series of fires and explosions related to combustible dust. The Wood Machinery Manufacturers of America's Industrial Dust Task Force has been following the Occupational Safety and Health Administration on the new rules since October 2009. The goal is to ensure that companies follow proper dust collection procedures.

Wood Machinery Manufacturers of America (WMMA)  fully supports efforts to protect workers against the dangers of combustible dust. However, the organization is encouraging OSHA to avoid creating new economic hardships for woodworking companies and small manufacturers. Their observation says that if the companies find it difficult to meet the regulations, then it will be impossible to achieve the goal which is to protect the workers.

Art Sipple, State of Nevada Safety Consultation & Training Section Supervisor, OSHA asserts flammable dust being the biggest threat to the industry. Not only sawdust which in and of itself poses a fire hazard, but the generation of fine dust particles creates an even bigger hazard. Organic dust particles are highly flammable and under favorable conditions, highly explosive. In addition, some forms of wood release toxic materials when being cut; Western Red Cedar is one example. Another issue is rotating equipment. Guarding is a major issue with all rotating machinery.

Sipple says that the regulations are important as they not only ensure the safety of the employees, it further saves extra expenses related to the injuries and illness. He says: “Controls for any industry are practical. The lack of controls causes injuries and illnesses that cost companies a lot of money, not only through insurance claims with workers compensation insurance, but through lost time and production. Generally, $1 spent on controls and safe work practices save employers $3 or more by preventing problems. For a company to run on high performance and high demand, it has to control injuries and illnesses or the company will not be competitive and lose market shares.”

Recent Health and Safety Executive (HSE) accident statistics shows that accidents involving contact with the dangerous parts of machinery or the material being machined accounted for approximately one quarter of all of the fatal injuries recorded in the woodworking industry, and approximately half of all major injury accidents.

The risks associated with the use of woodworking machinery are high since they rely on high-speed sharp cutters to do the job and in many cases, these are necessarily exposed to enable the machining process to take place. Additionally, many machines are still hand-fed; woodworking is probably the main industry where the hands of the operator are constantly exposed to danger.

Woodworking